Trata may refer to:

Places in Slovenia:
Trata (Kočevje), a neighborhood of the town of Kočevje in the Municipality of Kočevje
Trata (Ljubljana), a former settlement in the City Municipality of Ljubljana
Trata (Prapetno Brdo), a hamlet of Prapetno Brdo in the municipality of Tolmin
Trata pri Velesovem, a village in the Municipality of Cerklje na Gorenjskem
Trata, Škofja Loka, a settlement in the Municipality of Škofja Loka
Spodnja Trata, a hamlet of Zalog pri Cerkljah in the Municipality of Cerklje na Gorenjskem
Zgornja Trata, a hamlet of Zalog pri Cerkljah in the Municipality of Cerklje na Gorenjskem

Other:
Trata (dance), a traditional Greek dance